Charles Aman (September 25, 1887 – January 9, 1936) was an American rower who competed in the 1904 Summer Olympics. In 1904, he was part of the American boat which won the silver medal in the coxless fours. He committed suicide in his birthplace of Kansas City, Missouri in 1936.

References

External links
 profile

1887 births
1936 deaths
1936 suicides
Rowers at the 1904 Summer Olympics
Olympic silver medalists for the United States in rowing
American male rowers
Medalists at the 1904 Summer Olympics
Suicides by hanging in Missouri
Sportspeople from Kansas City, Missouri